Sami Haddadin (born 26 June 1980) is an electrical engineer, computer scientist, and university professor in the field of robotics and artificial intelligence (AI). Since April 2018, he has been the executive director of the Munich Institute of Robotics and Machine Intelligence (MIRMI) at the Technical University of Munich and holds the Chair of Robotics and Systems Intelligence.

Life 
Sami Haddadin was born in Neustadt am Rübenberge, the eldest of three children to a Jordanian doctor and a Finnish nurse. He grew up with his sister and brother in his birthplace Neustadt am Rübenberge. He is married and has three children. He completed his Abitur in 1999 in Stolzenau at the local high school and studied electrical engineering and informatics at the Gottfried Wilhelm Leibniz University of Hanover, the University of Hagen, the University of Oulu in Finland and in Munich. He holds degrees in electrical engineering, computer science and technology management from the Technical University of Munich and the Center for Digital Technology and Management (CDTM), a joint institute of the Technical University of Munich and the Ludwig Maximilians University of Munich. After that, he worked in various functions as a research assistant at DLR. He received his doctorate summa cum laude from RWTH Aachen University in 2011. From April 2014 to April 2018, Haddadin held the chair of the Institute of Automatic Control at the Gottfried Wilhelm Leibniz University Hannover. In 2018, he accepted the call as professor and director of the Munich Institute of Robotics and Machine Intelligence (MIRMI) at the Technical University of Munich (TUM). He has published more than 200 scientific articles. He is one of the founders of the German-based robotic firm Franka Emika GmbH. His patent "Tactile Robot" is the latest entry in the collection "Milestone made in Germany" (DPMA). The invention Panda Robotic Arm was included in the list of "The 50 best inventions of 2018" of Time magazine and in the September 2020 issue of the National Geographic magazine ("Meet the Robots"). Sami Haddadin and his team conceived the exhibition KI.ROBOTIK.DESIGN, in which the emergence, present and future of robotics and AI are presented at the Pinakothek der Moderne

Awards 
In 2021 Sami Haddadin was accepted as a member of the German National Academy of Sciences Leopoldina For 2019, Haddadin was awarded the Gottfried Wilhelm Leibniz-Prize. Also in 2019 he was elected a member of the German Academy of Science and Engineering (acatech). On November 29, 2017, together with his brother Simon and Sven Parusel, he was awarded the German Future Prize, endowed with 250,000 euros, by Federal President Frank-Walter Steinmeier. The Prize was awarded for the concept "inexpensive, flexible and intuitively operable robots", which turn automats into helpers to humans. In 2015, Haddadin was awarded the Alfried-Krupp Sponsorship Award for Young University Teachers. The prize granted Haddadin 1 million euros over a period of five years. In 2014, Haddadin was appointed professor at the Gottfried Wilhelm Leibniz University in Hanover in the Faculty of Electrical Engineering and Computer Science. At that time, he was the youngest scientist in Germany to hold a chair for control engineering. In 2012, Haddadin's doctoral thesis received the Georges Giralt PhD Award.

Startups 

 2016 – Founder of Franka Emika GmbH, Munich
 2014 – 2016 CEO & Founder of KBee AG, Munich
 2012 – 2014 CEO & Founder of Kastanienbaum GmbH, Munich

Memberships and groups 
Together with the region of Hanover and Leibniz University, Haddadin developed the "Robot Factory" (Roboterfabrik) training program, which started in October 2017 at various schools. He has also participated in groups such as the Lower Saxony Commission (Kommission Niedersachsen 2030), the Study Commission (dt. Enquete-Kommission) "Artificial Intelligence – Social Responsibility and Economic, Social and Ecological Potential", German Parliament, the EU High-Level Industrial Roundtable "Industry 2030", and the EU High-Level Expert Group on "Artificial Intelligence". In 2019, he became a member of the German National Academy of Science and Engineering (acatech) as well as part of the Council of the Future Bavarian Economy (Zukunftsrat der Bayerischen Wirtschaft). In 2020, he was appointed as Chairman of the Bavarian AI Council. Since 2021, Haddadin became member of the German National Academy of Sciences Leopoldina.

Publications 

 Kühn, J., Bagnato, C., Burdet, E., Haddadin S. Arm movement adaptation to concurrent pain constraints. Scientific Reports 11, 6792 (2021).
 M. Tröbinger et al. and S. Haddadin, "Introducing GARMI - A Service Robotics Platform to Support the Elderly at Home: Design Philosophy, System Overview and First Results," in IEEE Robotics and Automation Letters, vol. 6, no. 3, pp. 5857–5864, July 2021.
 McLennan, S., Fiske, A., Celi, L., Müller, R., Harder, J.,Ritt, K., Haddadin, S., Buyx, A. (2020): An embedded ethics approach for AI development. Nature Machine Intelligence 2 (7), 488–490.
 Haddadin, S., Johannsmeier, L., & Ledezma, F. D. (2018): Tactile robots as a central embodiment of the Tactile Internet. Proceedings of the IEEE, 107(2), 471–487.
 Haddadin, S., Krieger, K., Albu-Schäffer, A., & Lilge, T. (2018): Exploiting elastic energy storage for "blind" cyclic manipulation: Modeling, stability analysis, control, and experiments for dribbling. IEEE Transactions on Robotics, 34(1), 91–112.
 Tomic T, Ott C, Haddadin S: "External Wrench Estimation, Collision Detection, and Reflex Reaction for Flying Robots". IEEE Transactions on Robotics. 2017; 33(6): 1467–1482.
 Haddadin S., De Luca A., Albu-Schäffer A. (2017): "Robot Collisions: A Survey on Detection, Isolation, and Identification". IEEE Transactions on Robotics. 33(6): 1292–1312.
 Haddadin S., Croft E. (2016) Physical Human–Robot Interaction. In: Siciliano B., Khatib O. (eds) Springer Handbook of Robotics. Springer Handbooks. Springer, Cham.
 Haddadin S. (2014): "Towards Safe Robots". Springer Tracts in Advanced Robotics 90, Springer Berlin Heidelberg.
 Haddadin S, Haddadin S, Khoury A, Rokahr T, Parusel S, Burgkart R, Bicchi A, Albu-Schäffer. A (2012): "On making robots understand safety: Embedding injury knowledge into control". The International Journal of Robotics Research. 31(13): 1578–1602.
 Hochberg LR, Bacher D, Jarosiewicz B, Masse NY, Simeral JD, Vogel J, Haddadin S, Liu J, Cash SS, van der Smagt P, et al. (2012): "Reach and grasp by people with tetraplegia using a neurally controlled robotic arm". Nature 485: 372–375.
 Yang, C., Ganesh, G., Haddadin, S., Parusel, S., Albu-Schaeffer, A., & Burdet, E. (2011). Human-like adaptation of force and impedance in stable and unstable interactions. IEEE transactions on robotics, 27(5), 918–930.
 Haddadin, S, Albu-Schäffer A, Hirzinger G (2009): "G. Requirements for safe robots: Measurements, analysis and new insights". The International Journal of Robotics Research. 28(11–12): 1507–1527.

References

External links 

Living people
1980 births
German scientists